With a Little Help (CreateSpace, 2010) is a collection consisting of mostly previously published science fiction short stories and novellas by Cory Doctorow, with one new short story.  This is Doctorow's third published collection, following Overclocked: Stories of the Future Present.  Each story includes an afterword by the author, and the anthology includes an introduction by Jonathan Coulton and an afterword by Russell Galen.

Footnotes

External links 
Official Book Page on Cory Doctorow's website
Online Version of the book

2010 short story collections
Short story collections by Cory Doctorow